The Texas League Pitcher of the Year Award is an annual award given to the best pitcher in Minor League Baseball's Texas League based on their regular-season performance as voted on by league managers. League broadcasters, Minor League Baseball executives, and members of the media have previously voted as well. Though the league was established in 1888, the award was not created until 1933. The Texas League suspended operations during World War II from 1943 to 1945. After the cancellation of the 2020 season, the league was known as the Double-A Central in 2021 before reverting to the Texas League name in 2022.

Eleven players from the San Antonio Missions have been selected for the Pitcher of the Year Award, more than any other team in the league, followed by the Arkansas Travelers (8); the Dallas Rangers (7); the Shreveport Captains (6); the Tulsa Drillers (5); the El Paso Diablos and Jackson Mets (4); the Albuquerque Dodgers, Corpus Christi Hooks, and Frisco RoughRiders (3); the Amarillo Giants, Austin Braves, Round Rock Express, and Tulsa Oilers (2); and the Alexandria Aces, Beaumont Exporters, Dallas–Fort Worth Spurs, Fort Worth Cats, Galveston Buccaneers, Houston Buffaloes, Midland RockHounds, Shreveport Sports, Springfield Cardinals, Victoria Rosebuds, and Wichita Wranglers (1).

Ten players from the San Francisco Giants Major League Baseball (MLB) organization have won the award, more than any other, followed by the Los Angeles Dodgers organization (9); the Houston Astros and St. Louis Cardinals organizations (7); the New York Mets, San Diego Padres, and Texas Rangers organizations (4); the Baltimore Orioles, Colorado Rockies, Los Angeles Angels, Milwaukee Brewers, and Seattle Mariners organizations (3); the Atlanta Braves and Cleveland Guardians organizations (2); and the Chicago Cubs, Cincinnati Reds, Detroit Tigers, and Oakland Athletics organizations (1). Five award winners played for teams that were not affiliated with any MLB organization.

Winners

Wins by team

Active Texas League teams appear in bold.

Wins by organization

Active Texas League–Major League Baseball affiliations appear in bold.

References
Specific

General

Awards established in 1933
Minor league baseball trophies and awards
Pitcher